Jeewan Hathi is a 2016 Pakistani dark comedy film directed by Meenu Gaur and Farjad Nabi and written by Fasih Bari Khan. Shailja Kejriwal and Mazhar Zaidi have produced the film. The Film has Samiya Mumtaz, Hina Dilpazeer, Naseeruddin Shah, Saife Hassan and Adnan Jaffar as lead cast in the film.

Plot

Cast
Samiya Mumtaz
Hina Dilpazeer
Naseeruddin Shah
Fawad Khan
Saife Hassan
Adnan Jaffar
Nimra Bucha
Kiran Tabeir
Jahangir Khan
Nazarul Hassan

Production
Jeewan Hathi is produced under Matteela Films. The film is directed by the duo of Meenu Gaur and Farjad Nabi who previously directed Zinda Bhaag (2013). The film is written by Fasih Bari Khan, produced by Shailja Kejriwal and co-produced by Vikas Sharma. The cast of the film includes Samiya Mumtaz, Hina Dilpazeer, Naseeruddin Shah, Saife Hassan, Fawad Khan, Adnan Jaffar, Nazarul Hassan and Kiran Tabeer. Hina Dilpazeer told in an interview that she will play the role of a morning show host at television channel of her husband Naseeruddin Shah. Dilpazeer said, "I’m playing a role of morning show host and my husband (Naseerudin Shah) owns the TV channel where I work," She also told that the film was shot in Karachi and Naseeruddin Shah especially came to Karachi for the shooting.

Soundtrack
The soundtrack of the film consist of two songs by Ali Aftab Saeed and Sahir Ali Bagga and lyrics by Hasan Mujtaba.

Release 
The film was first screened at London Indian Film Festival on 17 July 2016 and subsequently at the Locarno International Film Festival on 11 August 2017. It will be released across Pakistan on 4 November 2016.

References

External links

2016 films
2016 black comedy films
Pakistani black comedy films
Films set in Karachi
Films scored by Sahir Ali Bagga
2016 comedy films